Ruža is a South Slavic feminine given name, cognate of the name Rose. Its diminutive form is Ružica. It may refer to:

 Ruža Pospiš-Baldani, Croatian opera singer
 Ruža Tomašić, Croatian politician
 Ruža Petrović, Croatian anti-fascist
 Ruža Vojsk, a Slovenian former gymnast

Feminine given names
Slavic feminine given names
Croatian feminine given names
Serbian feminine given names